Mavado may refer to:
Mavado (singer)
Mavado, a character in the Mortal Kombat series

See also
Movado